Olga Fadeïeva (born 26 May 1972) is a retired Russian female volleyball player.

She was part of the Russia women's national volleyball team at the 2004 FIVB World Grand Prix.

Clubs

References

External links 
 FIVB profile

1972 births
Living people
Russian women's volleyball players
Place of birth missing (living people)